Zangian or Zangiyan or Zangeyan may refer to:
 Zangian, Golestan
 Zangian, Kerman
 Zangian, Mazandaran
 Zangian, Sistan and Baluchestan